Ismeniae Fossae is a region containing irregular valleys on Mars. It is located in the Ismenius Lacus quadrangle. It is along the dichotomy boundary that is between the old, heavily cratered southern highlands and the low plains of the northern hemisphere. Ismeniae Fossae is to the immediate west of Moreux crater. The regions of plateaus known as Deuteronilus Mensae and Protonilus Mensae are to the northwest and northeast of Ismeniae Fossae.

References

Ismenius Lacus quadrangle